The International North West 200 is a motorcycle road race first held in 1929 on a  street circuit known as the Triangle between the towns of Portstewart, Coleraine and Portrush in Causeway Coast and Glens, Northern Ireland, United Kingdom. It is the largest annual sporting event in Northern Ireland, with the race weekend attracting over 150,000 visitors from all over the world.

Originally intended to be held somewhere in the north west of Ireland and organised by the City of Derry & District Motor Club, the initial event was moved to the north coast but the name was never changed. Since 1964 the event has been organised by the Coleraine and District Motor Club. In 2010, the meeting featured daytime practice on the Thursday for the first time.

The 2011 event took place on Saturday 21 May. There were significant delays due to a hoax bomb alert and then an extensive oil spill on the track caused racing to be cancelled after the completion of only one race.

In 2022 the event returned as the fonaCab & Nicholl Oils North West 200. It was the first time the event has been held since 2019 after being cancelled for two consecutive years due to the COVID-19 Pandemic.

On 9 February 2023, an announcement was made by the Motorcycle Union of Ireland with regard to the running of the 2023 event. This followed a significant increase in the insurance premium required to cover the event and consequently placed the 2023 race schedule under threat of being cancelled.

However on 15 March 2023, the event's organisers, the Coleraine & District Motor Club issued a statement via their Facebook page stating that in the wake of a sizeable donation by a prominent businessman and a revision of the quotation in connection with the insurance premium, that the 2023 International North West 200 would be taking place.

Race format

The North West 200 was originally run over two hundred miles as a handicap race, before changing to its current format of several separate races, each running 4–6 laps during Saturday afternoon. Practice is held on the Tuesday and Thursday evenings before the race. Both the practice and races are held on closed roads, but unlike the Isle of Man TT races which are run in a time-trial format, all riders compete together as with normal circuit racing.

Over the years the number and the classes of races has varied according to the latest regulations. From 1990 until 2010, there was always a 125 cc race and since 1992 the North West 200 race has been for Superbikes.

From 2012, all practice sessions will take place during the day, and the racing programme has been extended to include two races on the Thursday evening. All races will be held over six laps, except for the newly introduced Supertwin event.

The course
The street circuit is made up almost entirely of public roads (A2, B185 & A29) but does include three speed-reducing chicanes. The route, running anti-clockwise enters the outskirts of the towns passing many private houses. To help improve track safety street signs are removed at parts of the track and bales of hay are used to wrap the base of lampposts and telegraph poles.

The original start/finish line was located near Magherabouy but moved to the Portmore Road in Portstewart in 1930.

1973 saw the first major changes to the course, which include the exclusion of the Promenade at Portstewart from the route and the moving of the start/finish line to its current location between Juniper Hill and Millbank Avenue. These changes meant the route used Station Road (B185) for the first time and saw the introduction of York Corner. Shell Hill Bridge, an iconic part of the original course was used for the last time in 1979. In 1980, a new link road, from University Corner to Ballysally Roundabout, was introduced. A chicane was introduced just before the approach to the Juniper Hill corner in 1983 and in 1988 improvements were made to Mather's Cross and the start/finish chicane was introduced to reduce the speeds around Primrose Hill as well as allowing safer access to the pitlane.

At the end of 2009 Mather's Cross was widened in order improve safety at the corner. For 2010 additional modifications were made to the circuit to improve safety. A new purpose built chicane at Mather's Cross was introduced to reduce speeds at the corner and safety improvements made to the area at Station corner.

Jack Brett recorded the first  lap of the course on a Norton 500cc in 1957.

During Tuesday's practice at the 2012 event Martin Jessopp set a new fastest speed trap time, reaching  on the approach to University Corner.

Deaths at the event

The first recorded death at the event was Norman Wainwright who was killed in 1939.

1979
Black Saturday as it is known, is regarded as the darkest day in the event's history after crashes claimed the lives of three riders, Tom Herron, Brian Hamilton and Frank Kennedy who died months later from his injuries.

Robert Dunlop
Robert Dunlop died on 15 May 2008 while practising in the 250cc class. The incident occurred as he was approaching Mather's Cross during the 125/250/400cc practice session. Fellow rider Darren Burns was following immediately behind and collided with Robert, suffering a broken leg and suspected concussion. Robert suffered severe chest injuries and died in hospital shortly afterwards.

Mark Young
Twenty-two-year-old Mark Young died during the 2009 event on 17 May 2009. It was Young's first race at the North West 200 although he had road racing experience.

Mark Buckley
Thirty-five-year-old Mark Buckley suffered a fatal crash on Millbank Avenue outside Portstewart during the Superstock race on 19 May 2012. He was taken to hospital but later died from his injuries. No other competitors were involved with this incident.

Simon Andrews
Andrews was airlifted to a hospital in Northern Ireland in critical condition after suffering a serious crash while competing in the North West 200 on Saturday, 17 May 2014. Andrews came off his bike and slid down the asphalt until he collided head-first with a section of raised concrete pavement while curbing at high speed in Portrush, County Antrim.  After receiving immediate medical intervention from the race doctors and medics, Andrews was airlifted to the Royal Victoria Hospital in Belfast in a critical condition after suffering the high-speed accident on the approach to Metropole corner. Andrews was competing in the second Superstock race of the event aboard his BMW.  He died in hospital on 19 May 2014 as a result of his injuries, aged 31.

Malachi Mitchell-Thomas
Malachi Mitchell-Thomas died as a result of a crash on the third lap of the Supertwins race at the Vauxhall International North West 200 on 14 May 2016.
The 20-year-old from Chorley in Lancashire crashed his Burrows Engineering Kawasaki on the approach to Black Hill. The race was immediately red flagged and Malachi was treated by medical staff from the MCUI Medical team but succumbed to his injuries at the scene. No other riders were involved in the incident.
Racing was subsequently abandoned.

All competitor deaths

Winners
Alastair Seeley from Northern Ireland, holds the record number of 27 wins. Robert Dunlop was the previous record holder with 15 wins. Michael Rutter won fourteen races. Joey Dunlop (Robert's brother) won thirteen races. Michael Dunlop and William Dunlop (both sons of Robert) have also won races at the North West 200.

The early years of the event was dominated by British motorcycle manufacturers, in particular Norton. It was only in 1964 that Honda claimed their first victory. 2010 saw BMW score their first victory at the event and also the first non-Japanese manufacturer to claim a victory since 1997. Yamaha is the only manufacturer to have a clean sweep, winning all five races in 1979.

Multiple winners

By year

Manufacturers

Media coverage

The event is covered by BBC Northern Ireland having previously been covered by UTV. All races are live on the BBC iPlayer. There is also live radio coverage on BBC Radio Ulster and live text commentary on the BBC Sport NI website. BBC NI also show highlights programmes presented by Stephen Watson, usually on the Sunday and Monday nights after the event. BBC Commentators include BBC MotoGP commentator Steve Parrish and five-time winner on a single day Phillip McCallen. In 2022 it was announced that BBC Sport NI had extended its contract to provide coverage of the event until 2026.

Video game
The North West 200 features in Jester Interactive's PlayStation 2 title TT Superbikes: Real Road Racing Championship released at the end of May 2008. It is the sequel to their top 10 game TT Superbikes released in 2005. It is also featured in Milestone srl's Ride 2 for PlayStation 4, Xbox One and PC.

See also
Clady Circuit
Dundrod Circuit
Isle of Man TT Races
Ulster Grand Prix

References

External links

The Official Website of the Kennedy International North West 200 The Official North 200 Website
Motorbikes - BBC Sport BBC North West 200 Website

 
North West 200
North West 200 fatal accidents
Sport deaths in Northern Ireland
Annual events in Northern Ireland
Annual sporting events in the United Kingdom
Spring (season) events in Northern Ireland